Chengqu, or Cheng District is a district of the city of Yangquan, Shanxi province, China.

References
www.xzqh.org

External links

County-level divisions of Shanxi
Yangquan